Tanvi Shah is the first Indian woman to win a Grammy. Tanvi was born on 1 December 1985 in Tamil Nadu, India. She has sung in Tamil, Hindi and Telugu. In addition, she sings in Spanish, Portuguese and other romance languages, as well as Arabic. Her first song was "Fanaa" for the movie Yuva.

Career
She has a running collaboration with A.R. Rahman and has sung a number of songs for him, including songs from Sillunu Oru Kadhal, Slumdog Millionaire and recently Delhi-6. She wrote the Spanish lyrics for "Jai Ho".

Her success with A.R. Rahman got her invitations from leading music directors and she has sung for Yuvan Shankar Raja,  Amit Trivedi and other music directors.

She shared the Grammy Award for Best Song Written for Visual Media with A.R. Rahman and Gulzar in the 52nd Grammy Awards for the song Jai Ho, for writing the Spanish lyrics for the song. With the success of Slumdog Millionaire, Shah has been featured in Snoop Dogg's song "Snoop Dogg Millionaire". Apart from the Grammy, she also received the BMI Award in 2009 in London for the same and also shares the World Soundtrack Award (2009) with Rahman and Gulzar.

She performed for the Yuvan - Live in Concert in January 2011 in Chennai and in Malaysia at the KLIMF in 2012. She also performed at Coke Studio concert at IIM Bangalore on 22 November 2013, featuring Amit Trivedi .

She was invited to speak at the TEDxSF conference  on Global Health in Nov '12.

While she has done her fair share of playback singing for the film industry in India, she is an international star. This versatile singer's appeal lies in the fact that she can sing in several different languages, which has won her fans across the world.

Tanvi sings in Spanish, Portuguese, Afro-Cuban, Arabic besides Hindi, Tamil and Telugu and experiments with a wide range of music with her band. Her adaptability has been proven in her collaborative work with international music producers such as Gio Ortega (USA), Jeremy Hawkins (USA), Che Pope (USA), David Batteau (USA), and DJ Salah of Germany.

Tanvi has walked the green carpet at the Latin Grammy in 2011 and recently shared the stage with Lebohang Morake, South African singer and composer, famous for arranging and performing the music for The Lion King movies and stage productions.

She firmly believes that we all need to give back to society. She is actively involved with the Cancer Institute and with the “End Polio” campaign of Rotary International along with Amitabh Bachchan, A. R. Rahman and Anil Kapoor. She has donated her song, “Zindagi”, produced by JHawk, to the End Polio campaign album that features international artistes such as Itzhak Perlman, David Sanborn, Ziggy Marley, Donovan and members of the Congolese band, Staff Benda Bilili.

Awards
Grammy Awards
 Best Song Written For Motion Picture, Television Or Other Visual Media – 'Jai Ho'  – Slumdog Millionaire (2010)

BMI Award
 BMI Award for Best Song Written for a Motion Picture, Television or Other Visual Media|Best Song Written For Motion Picture, Television Or Other Visual Media – 'Jai Ho'  – Slumdog Millionaire (2010)

Discography

Film scores

Non-film scores

References

External links
 
 

Living people
Indian women playback singers
Indian women singer-songwriters
Indian singer-songwriters
Grammy Award winners
Tamil playback singers
Bollywood playback singers
Singers from Chennai
1982 births
21st-century Indian singers
21st-century Indian women singers
Women musicians from Tamil Nadu